The Giants–Patriots rivalry is a National Football League (NFL) rivalry between the New York Giants and the New England Patriots. The Patriots currently lead the all-time series 7–6. The two teams met in the Super Bowl twice, both won by the Giants. They play in different conferences (the Giants as a member of the NFC East, and the Patriots as a member of the AFC East), and thus they only meet once every four regular seasons and occasionally in the preseason. This rivalry sparked debates among sports fans in Boston and New York City, evoking comparisons to the fierce Yankees–Red Sox rivalry in Major League Baseball.

History

1970s–1990s: The Beginning
The two teams first met twice in the 1970s, splitting both meetings. However, the roots of the rivalry originated from Bill Parcells, who was head coach of the Giants from 1983 to 1990. Parcells' staff featured defensive coordinator Bill Belichick, the future Patriots head coach who joined the team alongside Parcells in 1979. In 1988, future Giants head coach Tom Coughlin joined the team as a wide receivers coach. Both Belichick and Coughlin were on Parcells' staff when the Giants won Super Bowl XXV (a.k.a. the Wide Right game) following the 1990 season. That 1990 season also saw the Giants hand the Patriots their 14th consecutive defeat. In Week 17 at New England, the Giants defeated the Patriots 13–10 to send New England to a franchise-worst 1–15 season, and a winless home campaign. 

Parcells left the Giants following the Super Bowl victory, but in 1993, he took over as the Patriots head coach. In his fourth season, Parcells led the Patriots to a berth in Super Bowl XXXI, with Belichick returning as an assistant coach following a five-year stint as head coach of the Cleveland Browns. Along the way, the Patriots clinched a first-round bye in Week 17 by overcoming a 22–3 fourth quarter deficit to defeat the Giants 23–22. Meanwhile, Coughlin earned his first head coaching job with the Jacksonville Jaguars in the 1995 season, and then guided the second-year franchise to the AFC Championship game. However, the Patriots defeated the Jaguars to advance to the Super Bowl, where they lost to the Green Bay Packers. After the season, both Parcells and Belichick left to join the rival New York Jets, while Coughlin remained as the Jaguars head coach until 2002.

2000s–2010s: Tom Brady vs. Eli Manning
In 2000, Belichick became the Patriots head coach, and the following season, promoted Tom Brady to starting quarterback. This era would produce six Super Bowl championships for the Patriots, but also oversaw three defeats in the title game. In the 2004 season, Coughlin was hired by the Giants as head coach, and by the middle of the season, promoted Eli Manning to starter.

The first meeting between Brady and Eli Manning came in the final week of the 2007 season. New England entered the game holding a 15–0 record and were attempting to finish the regular season undefeated. Meanwhile, the Giants won a wild-card spot and had nothing to play for. However, New York played their starters throughout in an attempt to spoil the Patriots' perfect season. In the end, New England won the game 38–35 to finish 16–0, with Brady connecting for a then-record 50th touchdown pass to Randy Moss.

The Patriots met the Giants again in Super Bowl XLII in an attempt to finish with a 19–0 season. However, in one of the greatest upsets in NFL history, the Giants defeated the Patriots 17–14 to win the championship. With the Patriots leading 14–10 late in the fourth quarter, Manning generated a key go-ahead scoring drive, highlighted by the now-famous Helmet Catch to David Tyree. The winning points were scored on a touchdown pass to Plaxico Burress, and the Giants defense forced the Patriots into a turnover on downs on their final possession.

The two teams faced each other again in Super Bowl XLVI during the 2011 season. Along the way, the Giants dealt the Patriots one of their three defeats in the regular season, winning 24–20 in New England. Much like their previous Super Bowl meeting, the game was tightly contested and had a signature moment as well, with Manning connecting to Mario Manningham late in the fourth quarter just as his toes barely stepped inbounds. The winning points of the game were scored on an uncontested touchdown run by Ahmad Bradshaw, and the Patriots' attempt at a Hail Mary touchdown in the closing seconds fell incomplete.

The final meeting between Brady and Eli Manning occurred during the 2015 season. In another close contest, the Patriots barely won 27–26, with kicker Stephen Gostkowski clinching the game on a last-second field goal. The season was also Coughlin's last with the Giants as he retired following the season. Though Manning would retire following the 2019 season, he did not play in the Giants' 35–14 blowout loss to the Patriots that season, which was also Brady's last before joining the Tampa Bay Buccaneers the following offseason.

Overall, Eli Manning owned a 3–2 all-time record against Tom Brady, buoyed by the two Super Bowl victories. In the regular season, neither quarterback managed to win on their home field, with Manning defeating Brady in their only meeting at Gillette Stadium in 2011 and Brady winning at Giants Stadium in 2007 and MetLife Stadium in 2015. This rivalry, similar to the matchup between Brady and Eli's brother Peyton, featured close contests and memorable moments between the two quarterbacks, even though Eli finished with generally inferior stats than Brady all-time.

Game results

|-
| 
| style="|Giants  16–0
| Harvard Stadium
| Giants  1–0
| 
|-
| 
| style="|Patriots  28–20
| Yale Bowl
| Tie  1–1
| 
|-
| 
|style="|Giants  17–10
| Giants Stadium
| Giants  2–1
| 
|-

|-
| 
| style="|Giants  13–10
| Foxboro Stadium
| Giants  3–1
| Giants win Super Bowl XXV.
|-
| 
| style="|Patriots  23–22
| Giants Stadium
| Giants  3–2
| Patriots rally from 22–3 deficit, earn first-round bye with this win. Patriots lose Super Bowl XXXI.
|-
| 
|style="|Patriots  16–14
| Foxboro Stadium
| Tie  3–3
| 
|-

|-
| 
|style="|Patriots  17–6
| Gillette Stadium
| Patriots  4–3
| First start in the series for Tom Brady. Patriots take first lead in the series. Patriots win Super Bowl XXXVIII.
|-
| 
|style="|
| Giants Stadium
| Patriots  5–3
| First start in the series for Eli Manning. Patriots clinch 16–0 regular season.
|-
! 2007 playoffs
!style="|Giants  17–14
! University of Phoenix Stadium
! Patriots  5–4
! Super Bowl XLII. Giants end Patriots' quest for unbeaten season. Eli Manning's pass to David Tyree in the fourth quarter became known as the Helmet Catch.
|-

|-
| 
| style="|Giants  24–20
| Gillette Stadium
| Tie  5–5
| 
|-
! 2011 playoffs
! style="|Giants  21–17
! Lucas Oil Stadium
! Giants  6–5
! Super Bowl XLVI. 
|-
| 
| style="| Patriots  27–26
| MetLife Stadium
| Tied  6–6
| Final start in the series for Eli Manning.
|-
| 
| style="| Patriots  35–14
| Gillette Stadium
| Patriots  7–6
| Largest margin of victory in the series. Final start in the series for Tom Brady. Eli Manning's final NFL season.
|-

|-
|
| TBD
| MetLife Stadium
| 
|
|-

|-
| Regular season
| style="|
| Patriots 4–1
| Tie 3–3
| 
|-
| Postseason
| style="|
| N/A
| N/A
| Super Bowls XLII and XLVI.
|-
| Regular and postseason 
| style="|
| Patriots 4–1
| Tie 3–3
| Giants are 2–0 at neutral site games
|-

See also
 Jets–Patriots rivalry
 Yankees–Red Sox rivalry
 Celtics–Knicks rivalry
 National Football League rivalries

Notes and references

National Football League rivalries
New York Giants
New England Patriots
New England Patriots rivalries
New York Giants rivalries